Maksim Alekseyevich Shakhov (born 11 January 2005) is a Russian football player. He plays for FC Pari Nizhny Novgorod.

Club career
He made his debut for the main team of FC Nizhny Novgorod on 22 September 2021 in a Russian Cup game against FC Dynamo Barnaul.

Career statistics

References

External links
 
 
 

2005 births
Living people
Russian footballers
Association football midfielders
FC Nizhny Novgorod (2015) players